Frans Zimmer (born 5 June 1985), better known by his stage name Alle Farben (meaning All Colours in German) is a German DJ and producer. Since 2014 Zimmer is signed to the record label Guesstimate/b1 Recordings and the publishing house Budde Music.

Career 

Frans Zimmer was raised in Berlin's Kreuzberg district, where he lives and works today. After high school, Zimmer wanted to study art, but was not admitted to university. In the following years, he worked various odd jobs, including work as a confectioner in a Berlin café. In 2010, he began DJing in Berlin nightclubs and bars. Inspired by the artist Friedensreich Hundertwasser, he took the alias "Hundert Farben" (meaning Hundred Colours), which he later changed to his current stage name "Alle Farben" (meaning All Colours)

On 9 May 2012 he played for 30,000 people at the former Tempelhof Airport in Berlin. Since then, Zimmer DJs almost every weekend throughout Europe; he also played several shows in Tel Aviv.

In September 2013, Zimmer announced through his Facebook page that he had begun work on his debut album and in January 2014 in an interview with the German newspaper Die Tageszeitung he confirmed the album would be ready in a few months. On 15 April 2014 Alle Farben released She Moves (Far Away) featuring the vocals of Graham Candy as a prerelease and the album's debut single. The album, entitled Synesthesia – I Think in Colours as per the official cover and the iTunes download page (with some media outlets opting to use the shorter term Synesthesia album in their coverage of the release), was released on 25 May 2014 in Europe through Kallias record label and Sony Music. Its 15 tracks include collaborations with Graham Candy and Lydmor (on two songs apiece) and Sway Clarke II (on one). It also includes two bonus remixes She Moves by Bakermat and Goldfish. In 2019, Farben collaborated with James Blunt on the single and music video Walk Away.

Discography

Albums

Singles

As lead artist

As featured artist

*Did not appear in the official Belgian Ultratop 50 charts, but rather in the bubbling under Ultratip charts.

Others
 2009: Tanzinteresse
 2012: Danse/Pulp EP (Kallias Music)
 2012: Galant EP (Kallias Music)
 2012: Roundabout EP (Der Turnbeutel)
 2012: Sailorman EP (Kallias Music)
 2012: Alle Farben meets Rainer Weichhold EP (Kallias Music)
 2012: Sailorman - The Remixes EP (Kallias Music)
 2013: Tempelhof (Kallias)
 2014: Sometimes (featuring Graham Candy) (Synesthesia)
 2015: Get High (featuring Lowell)
 2015: Pretty Small EP (Alle Farben & YOUNOTUS) (Synesthesia)
 2016: My Ghost EP (Synesthesia)
 2016: Remember Yesterday (featuring Perttu & Michael Schulte) (Synesthesia)
 2016: Fall into the Night (Synesthesia)

Remixes 
 2011: Rene Bourgeois - Tico (Alle Farben Remix) (Supdub Records)
 2011: Lizzara & Tatsch - Trompa (Alle Farben Remix) (Ostfunk Records)
 2012: T.Y.P. - D.I.S.C.O. (Alle Farben Remix) (Polydor / Universal France)
 2012: Drauf & Dran - Elise (Alle Farben Remix) (Stylerockets)
 2012: Flapjack - Mister Sandman (Alle Farben Remix) (Stylerockets)
 2012: Shemian - Classical Symphony (Alle Farben Remix) (Wired UK)
 2012: K-Paul - Out Of Control (Alle Farben Remix) (Music is Music)
 2012: Ron Flatter - Herr Lonnert (Alle Farben Remix) (Pour La Vie)
 2012: Dimitri Andreas - Eida (Alle Farben Remix) (Gold Records)
 2012: Daughter - Youth (Alle Farben Remix)
 2013: Ben Ivory - Better Love (Alle Farben Remix) (bitclap!/Warner Music Germany)
 2013: Blitzkids mvt. - Heart On The Line (Alle Farben Dub Remix) (bitclap!/Warner Music Germany)
 2013: Tagträumer - The Only Thing In This World (Alle Farben Remix) (Neopren)
 2013: Alice Francis - Gangsterlove (Alle Farben Remix) (ChinChin Records)
 2013: Boss Axis - Challenger (Alle Farben Remix) (Parquet Recordings)
 2013: Parov Stelar - The Snake (Alle Farben Remix) (Island Records / Universal Music Germany)
 2013: Romeofoxtrott - Memories (Alle Farben Remix) (Hunting For Emotion)
 2013: Elias - Kaputt (Alle Farben Remix) (Island Records / Universal Music Germany)
 2014: Bebetta - Herr Kapellmeister (Alle Farben Remix) (Damm Records)
 2014: Irie Révoltés - Residanse (Alle Farben Remix) (ferryhouse productions)
 2014: Berlin Comedian Harmonists – Hallo, was machst du heut', Daisy? (Alle Farben Remix) (Deutsche Grammophon)
 2014: Goldfish – Moonwalk Away (Alle Farben Remix)
 2014: Hundreds presented by Alle Farben - She Moves & Our Past (Alle Farben Remix) (Synesthesia)
 2014: Elvis Presley vs. Alle Farben - Shake That Tambourine (Alle Farben Remix) (Sony Music Media)
 2014: Mø - Walk This Way (Alle Farben Remix) (Chess Club/RCA Victor)
 2014: The Avener & Phoebe Killdeer - Fade Out Lines (Alle Farben Remix) (Capitol)
 2015: Heymen - If I Play Your Game (Alle Farben & YOUNOTUS Remix) (Kontor Records)
 2015: Northern Lite with Aka Aka & Thalstroem - Take My Time (Alle Farben Remix) (Kontor Records)
 2015: Mantra feat. Lydia Rhodes - Away (Alle Farben Remix) (Ultra Records, LLC)
 2015: Buray - Istersen (Alle Farben Remix) (b1)
 2015: Jonah - All We Are (Alle Farben Remix) (Columbia)
 2016: Teenage Mutants & Laura Welsh - Falling for You (Alle Farben Remix) (Sony Music Entertainment)
 2016: Hooverphonic - Badaboom (Alle Farben Remix) (epic)
 2019: Hypanda & IA - Gotta Let Go (Alle Farben Remix)(UMG)
 2021: R3hab & Jolin Tsai - Stars Align (Alle Farben Remix) (Liquid State)

Awards and nominations 
 PARTYSAN Award
 2011: in the category Newcomer 
 Newcomer Contest Bayern
 2012: in the category DJ National
 1Live Krone
 2014: nominated in the category Beste Single 
 ECHO
 2015: nominated in the category Dance National 
 Newcomer Contest Bayern
 2015: in the category Vom Newcomer zum Star

References

External links 

 

1985 births
Living people
German DJs
Musicians from Berlin
German record producers
Electronic dance music DJs
Remixers